Wichard von Moellendorff (3 October 1881, Hong Kong – 4 May 1937, Berlin) was a German engineer and economist. He is most widely known for his involvement in economic policy during and after the First World War. He was also involved in materials research.

In 1916 Moellendorff developed the concept of "social economy" which was a variant of socialism in which rather than eliminating private property subordinates private interests to the society as a whole. He saw that this might be implemented by an organisation like Bismarck's National Economic Council (Volkswirschaftsrat). Moellendorff saw this as a way of establishing a "rejuvenated middle classes".

Following the German Revolution of November 1918, von Moellendorff was under-secretary to the Reichsminister für Wirtschaft (Minister for Economic Affairs) Rudolf Wissell. Together they were involved in developing a programme of "practical socialisation" based on corporatist principles which they claimed was superior both to capitalism and Marxist socialism. However their programme was rejected in the summer of 1919, and he abandoned any hopes ofn the imminent realisation of what he described as "conservative socialism".

Works
 (1916) Deutsche Gemeinwirtschaft (Berlin, Privately circulated "in ministries and imperial departments, in the offices of large enterprises and in various political clubs")
 (1917) Von Einst zu Einst: der alte Fritz, J. G. Fichte, Freiherr vom Stein, Friedrich List, Fürst Bismarck, Paul Lagarde über deutsche Gemeinwirtschaft (Jena: E. Diedrichs)
 (1918) Die neue Wirtschaft (Berlin)
 (1932) Konservativer Sozialismus (Hamburg: Hanseatische Verlags-Anstalt)

References

German materials scientists
1881 births
1937 deaths
German expatriates in British Hong Kong